Tommaso Benvenuti (born 12 December 1990) is an Italian rugby union player. He plays as a centre, wing or fullback. He plays for Benetton. In October 2010, he was selected for the Italy training squad preparing for the November tests. He made his Italy debut against Argentina on 13 November 2010. He also played at the 2011 Rugby World Cup in New Zealand.

Benvenuti has previously played for Benetton Treviso and Perpignan.
In January 2015, Tommaso made the journey across the Channel, joining Greene King IPA Championship side Bristol, and then left for Benetton Treviso from 2016 to 2022.

He gains a cap with the Barbarians on 1 December 2018, starting against Argentina at Twickenham, eventually winning the game 38-35 with what was described as an thrilling comeback.

About Rugby World Cup, on 21 August 2011, he was named in the final 31-man squad for the 2015 Rugby World Cup., on 24 August 2015, he was named in the final 31-man squad for the 2015 Rugby World Cup  and on 18 August 2019, he was named in the final 31-man squad for the 2019 Rugby World Cup.

From 2008 and 2010, Benvenuti was named in the Italy Under 20 squad and in 2010 also in the Italy A squad.

References

External links
ERC Rugby Profile
It's Rugby England Profile

1990 births
Living people
Benetton Rugby players
Italy international rugby union players
Barbarian F.C. players
Rugby union centres
Rugby union fullbacks
People from Vittorio Veneto
USA Perpignan players
Bristol Bears players